Joy Goswami (born 1954) is an Indian poet. Goswami writes in Bengali and is widely considered one of the most important Bengali poets of his generation.

Biography
Joy was born on 10 November 1954 in Kolkata. His family moved to Ranaghat, Nadia, West Bengal shortly after and he has lived there ever since. Goswami was introduced to and encouraged with respect to poetry by his father, Madhu Goswami a well-known freedom fighter in the area. He lost his father at the age of six, after which the family was sustained by his mother Sm. Sabita Goswami, a teacher, who in spite of her busy schedule, taught him and greatly influenced him in the Bengali language by narrating to him great works in Bengali literature. She died in 1984. Goswami's formal education stopped early, in grade eleven. By this time he was already writing poetry. After a long period of writing in little magazines and periodicals, his writing was finally published in the influential Desh Patrika. This brought his immediate critical acclaim and so long after his first poetry collection was published, named Christmas o Sheeter Sonnetguchchho (Sonets of Christmas and Winter). He has received the Anita-Sunil Basu Award from the Bangla Academy, Govt of W.B. the prestigious Ananda Purashkar in 1989 for Ghumiyechho, Jhaupata? (Have you slept, Pine leaf?) and the Sahitya Akademi Award, 2000 for his anthology Pagali tomara sange (With you, O crazy girl).

Works
 Christmas o Sheeter Sonnetguchchho (1976)
 Aleya Hrod (1981)
 Unmader Pathokromo (1986)
 Bhutumbhogoban (1988)
 Ghumiyechho Jhaupata? (1989)
 Jara Brishtite Bhijechhilo
 Santansantati
 Moutat Maheswar
 Sakalbelar Kobi
 Mrito Nagorir Raja
 Bhaloti Basibo
 Phulgachhe Ki Dhulo (2011)
 Atmiyoswajan (2011)

Published works by Jaya Gosvāmī (which is how his name is transliterated in the Library's catalog and Name Authority File) listed in the Library of Congress Catalog:

 Bajrabidyu_t-bharti khātā. Kalakātā: Ānanda Pābali'sārsa, 1995. 
 Bishāda. Kalakātā: Ānanda Pābali'sārsa, 1998. 
 Hrdaye premera ´sīrsha. Kalakātā: Ānanda Pābali'sārsa, 1994. 
 Jaga_tabāri. Kalakātā: Ānanda Pābali'sārsa, 2000. 
 Kabitāsamgraha. Kalakātā: Ānanda Pābali'sārsa, <1997–2001>
 Mā nishāda. Kalakātā: Ānanda Pābali'sārsa, 1999. 
 Manoramera upanyāsa. Kalakātā : Ānanda Pābali'sārsa, 1994. 
 Oh svapna! Kalakātā: Ānanda Pābali'sārsa, 1996. 
 Pāgalī, tomāra sange. Kalakātā: Ānanda Pābali'sārsa, 1994. 
 Pātāra po'sāka. Kalakātā: Ānanda Pābali'sārsa, 1997. 
 Pretapurusha o anupama kathā. Kalakātā: Ānanda, 2004. 
 Raudrachāyāra samkalana. Kalakātā: Ānanda Pābali'sārsa, 1998. 
 Sam'sodhana bā kātākuti. Kalakātā: Ānanda Pābali'sārsa, 2001. 
 Sānjhabātira rūpakathārā. Kalakātā: Ānanda Pābali'sārsa, 1998. 
 Seisaba seyālara. Kalakātā: Ānanda Pābali'sārsa, 1994. 
 Shanjhbati's dreams = Shanjhbatir rupkathara. New Delhi: Srishti Publishers & Distributors, 2004. 
 Suranga o pratirakshā. Kalakātā: Ānanda Pābali'sārsa, 1995. 
 Sūrya-porā chāi. Kalakātā: Ānanda Pābali'sārsa, 1999. 
 Yārā brshtite bhijechila. Kalakātā: Ānanda Pābali'sārsa, 1998.

Awards
Moortidevi Award (2017)
 Anita-Sunil Basu Award from Bangla Akademi, W.B. Govt.
 Ananda Purashkar (1990), (1998)
 Sahitya Akademi Award (2000)
 Bharatiya Bhasha Parishad Lifetime Achievement Award (2011)
 Rachana Samagra Purashkar (2011)
 Banga Bibhushan by W.B. Govt. (2012)
 Sera Bangali by ABP Group (2017)
 D.Litt. by University of Calcutta (2015)
 D.Litt. by Kalyani University (2017)

References

External links 
After Death Comes Water: An Evening of Poetry. With Joy Goswami and Sampurna Chattarji, World Poetry Day 2022, Mother Tongue Twisters, 23 March 2022.
Translation of six poems
Interview in Bengali
Review by Bhaloti Basibo on Joy Goswami
Poetry International page
Some MP3 recordings of him reading his poetry, along with a photograph, can be found at the South Asian Literary Recordings Project page.

Writers from Kolkata
20th-century Bengali poets
21st-century Bengali poets
1954 births
Living people
Bengali-language writers
Bengali poets
Bengali novelists
Bengali male poets
Bengali Hindus
20th-century Bengalis
21st-century Bengalis
Recipients of the Ananda Purashkar
Recipients of the Sahitya Akademi Award in Bengali
International Writing Program alumni
Indian poets
Indian novelists
Indian male writers
Indian male novelists
Indian male poets
20th-century Indian poets
21st-century Indian poets
20th-century Indian male writers
21st-century Indian male writers
20th-century Indian novelists
21st-century Indian novelists
20th-century Indian writers
21st-century Indian writers
Poets from West Bengal